The 2006 Utah State Aggies football team represented Utah State University as a member of the Western Athletic Conference (WAC) in 2006 NCAA Division I FBS football season. The Aggies were led by second-year head coach Brent Guy and played their home games in Romney Stadium in Logan, Utah.

Schedule

References

Utah State
Utah State Aggies football seasons
Utah State Aggies football